Cassinia  tegulata commonly known as avenue cassinia, is a species of flowering plant in the family Asteraceae and is endemic to a small area near the Victoria-South Australia border. It is a small to medium-sized shrub with hairy foliage, needle-shaped leaves, and dense heads of off-white to cream-coloured flowers arranged in corymbs.

Description
The heads are arranged in groups of 100 to 150 in corymbs  in diameter.

Taxonomy and naming
Cassinia  tegulata was first formally described in 2004 by Anthony Edward Orchard in Australian Systematic Botany from specimens collected near Narracoorte in 2004.

Distribution and habitat
Avenue cassinia grows in the shrubland, in roadside vegetation and in wetland between sand dunes. It occurs near Edenhope in far western Victoria and in Lucindale and Blackford in far south-eastern South Australia.

Conservation status
This cassinia is listed as "critically endangered" under the Australian Government Environment Protection and Biodiversity Conservation Act 1999 and as "endangered" under the South Australian Government National Parks and Wildlife Act 1972. The main threats to the species include land clearing and roadwork maintenance, but fire has been shown to be a useful tool in regeneration of seedlings.

References

tegulata
Asterales of Australia
Plants described in 2004
Flora of South Australia